City Island may refer to:

 City Island (Daytona Beach), Florida
 City Island, Bronx, New York
 City Island (Pennsylvania)
 City Island Bridge, connects City Island and Bronx, New York
 City Island Harbor, Bronx, New York
 City Island (film), 2009 film by Raymond De Felitta set on City Island, New York
 London City Island, United Kingdom

See also
 Île de la Cité, island in Paris whose name translates to "City Island"